László Németh (1901–1975) was a Hungarian dentist and writer.

The same or a similar name has been borne by:
 László Németh (basketball) (born 1951), Hungarian basketball coach
 László Német (born 1956), Serbian Roman Catholic bishop
 László Németh, developer of the Hunspell software
 László Németh (weightlifter) (born 1970), Hungarian weightlifter